Jan Herzog (born 8 August 1974 in Berlin) is a German rower.

References

External links
 

1974 births
Living people
Rowers from Berlin
Olympic rowers of Germany
Rowers at the 2000 Summer Olympics
Rowers at the 2004 Summer Olympics
World Rowing Championships medalists for Germany
German male rowers
20th-century German people